The Franklin O-225 (company designation 4A/4A4) was an American air-cooled aircraft engine that first ran in the mid-1940s. The engine was of four-cylinder, horizontally-opposed layout and displaced .

Variants
4A4-75 at 1,950 rpm

4A4-85 at 2,200 rpm

4A4-100 at 2,550 rpm

4A-225 at 2,800 rpm

Applications
Cessna 160
Bendix 51
Bendix 52
Bendix 55
Dansaire Coupe
Eshelman Winglet 
Government Workshops Triciclo-Experimental

Specifications (4A4-100)

See also

References

Notes

Bibliography

 Gunston, Bill. (1986) World Encyclopedia of Aero Engines. Patrick Stephens: Wellingborough. p. 57

Franklin aircraft engines
1940s aircraft piston engines
Boxer engines